"You Can't Turn Me Off (In the Middle of Turning Me On)" is the debut single by R&B girl group High Inergy, released in 1977. The song was written by Pam Sawyer and Marilyn McLeod and was produced by Kent Washburn and arranged by Sylvester Rivers. It was the first single off their debut album, Turnin' On. 

The song reached No. 2 on the Billboard Black Singles chart, and No. 12 on the Hot 100 chart in December 1977.

The flipside, "Save It for a Rainy Day" was co-written by James Ingram.

References

1977 debut singles
Songs written by Pam Sawyer
1977 songs
Gordy Records singles
Songs written by Marilyn McLeod